Michael Tejera (born October 18, 1976) is a former professional baseball pitcher and current pitching coach for the Harrisburg Senators. He played in Major League Baseball (MLB) for the Florida Marlins and Texas Rangers.

Playoff appearances
After pitching a scoreless inning in game two, he took the loss in game three. He gave up just one hit in the latter game, a single to Kenny Lofton in the 11th inning. Lofton came around to score on a triple by Doug Glanville, which turned out to be the winning run. In the 2003 NLCS, some fans humorously remember Tejera for throwing a ball into the stands from the mound after a pitch slipped from his hand midway through his delivery.

After starting the 2009 season in the Mexican League, Tejera signed a minor league contract with the Cleveland Indians on July 10, 2009. He was let go at the end of the season, and in 2010 returned to the Mexican League with Tabasco.

Coaching career
Tejera has served as the pitching coach for the Gulf Coast Nationals and Harrisburg Senators.

See also

List of baseball players who defected from Cuba

References

External links
, or Retrosheet

1976 births
Living people
Akron Aeros players
Albuquerque Isotopes players
Bravos de Margarita players
Calgary Cannons players
Caribes de Anzoátegui players
Columbus Clippers players
Florida Marlins players
Fresno Grizzlies players
Indianapolis Indians players
Jupiter Hammerheads players
Kane County Cougars players
Major League Baseball pitchers
Major League Baseball players from Cuba
Cuban expatriate baseball players in the United States
Minor league baseball coaches
Navegantes del Magallanes players
Cuban expatriate baseball players in Venezuela
Oklahoma RedHawks players
Olmecas de Tabasco players
Pawtucket Red Sox players
Portland Sea Dogs players
Sultanes de Monterrey players
Texas Rangers players
Tigres de Quintana Roo players
Utica Blue Sox players
Cuban expatriate baseball players in Mexico
Cuban expatriate baseball players in Canada
Cañeros de Los Mochis players
Gulf Coast Marlins players
Sinon Bulls players
Cuban expatriate baseball players in Taiwan
Tigres del Licey players
Yaquis de Obregón players